Poul Jensen may refer to:

 Poul Jensen (astronomer), Danish astronomer
 Poul Richard Høj Jensen (born 1944), Danish Olympic sailor
 Poul Jensen (footballer, born 1934) (1934–2000), Danish football (soccer) player who won a silver medal at the 1960 Summer Olympics
 Poul Jensen (footballer, born 1899) (1899–1991), Danish football (soccer) player who played 30 games for the Danish national team
 Poul Ove Jensen (born 1937), Danish architect
 Poul Toft Jensen (1912–2000), Danish football (soccer) player who played 13 games for the Danish national team
 Poul Jensen, Danish chairman for the football club FC Fyn
 Poul Thorsbjerg Jensen (1922-2006), Danish furniture designer, mostly known for designing the Z chair, sold by Selig.